The Turkish parliamentary by-elections of 1986 were held on 28 September 1986 in order to elect 11 Members of Parliament to the Grand National Assembly of Turkey. The by-elections were held as a result of the vacation of 11 seats throughout the course of the 17th parliament. They took place in eleven different electoral districts, spanning ten provinces.

The governing Motherland Party (ANAP) won the most votes, winning 32.1% of the vote and 6 of the 11 seats up for election. The newly formed True Path Party (DYP) led by Hüsamettin Cindoruk came second with 23.5% and won 4 seats. Since ANAP and the DYP were both centre-right parties, their campaigns caused a vote split, which resulted in a reduction in the popular vote of the ANAP since the 1983 general election. The Social Democratic Populist Party (SHP) came third with 22.7% and won the remaining seat, with the party's leader Erdal İnönü becoming an MP for İzmir. All provinces elected a single MP apart from Manisa, where two MPs were elected. In addition to İnönü, the leader of the DYP Hüsamettin Cindoruk was also elected as an MP for Zonguldak.

The by-elections were followed by the 1987 general election just over a year later.

Results

Members elected

References

By-elections in Turkey
1986 elections in Turkey